The Seats of the Mighty is a novel published in 1896 by Gilbert Parker.  It was first published in serial form in The Atlantic starting in March 1895, and released in book form in 1896.  It was the third highest best-selling book in the United States in 1896.

It is a historical novel depicting the English conquest of Quebec with James Wolfe and the Marquis de Montcalm as two of the characters.

It was adapted into a play by late 1896 and a silent film in 1914 starring Lionel Barrymore.

References

External links
 The Seats of the Mighty full text at Project Gutenberg
 The Seats of the Mighty full scan (1896 print) via Google Books
 (1914 film version)
 

1896 Canadian novels
Novels set in Quebec
Works originally published in The Atlantic (magazine)
Canadian novels adapted into films
New Canadian Library